Hazzard County may refer to:

 Hazzard County, Georgia, a fictional county in the TV series The Dukes of Hazzard
 Hazzard County (play), a 2005 comedy-drama

See also